Vanuatu competed at the 2020 Summer Olympics in Tokyo, Japan. Originally scheduled to take place from 24 July to 9 August 2020, the 2020 Games were postponed to 23 July to 8 August 2021, because of the COVID-19 pandemic. This was the nation's ninth consecutive appearance at the Summer Olympics.

Competitors
The following is the list of number of competitors in the Games.

Judo

Vanuatu entered one male judoka into the Olympic tournament based on the International Judo Federation Olympics Individual Ranking.

Rowing

Vanuatu entered one boat in the men's single sculls for the games, after receiving the tripartite invitation quotas.

Qualification Legend: FA=Final A (medal); FB=Final B (non-medal); FC=Final C (non-medal); FD=Final D (non-medal); FE=Final E (non-medal); FF=Final F (non-medal); SA/B=Semifinals A/B; SC/D=Semifinals C/D; SE/F=Semifinals E/F; QF=Quarterfinals; R=Repechage

Table tennis

Vanuatu entered one athlete into the table tennis competition at the Games. Yoshua Shing received an invitation to compete, based on the rankings, following the cancellation of the 2021 Oceanian Olympics Qualification Tournament.

References

Olympics
Nations at the 2020 Summer Olympics
2020